The 2014–15 Botswana Premier League was the 50th season of the Botswana Premier League since its establishment in 1966. A total of 16 teams contested the league, with Township Rollers as the defending champions.

Team summaries

Promotion and relegation 
Teams promoted from Botswana First Division North and South
 BR Highlanders
 Letlapeng FC
 Police XI
 Sankoyo Bush Bucks

Teams relegated to Botswana First Division North and South
 Miscellaneous
 TAFIC F.C.
 UF Santos
 Wonder Sporting

Stadiums and locations

League table

Positions by round

References

Botswana Premier League
Botswana